Mr. Men and Little Miss, known in the United States as The Mr. Men Show and in French as Monsieur Bonhomme, is a 1994–1997 animated children's television series based on the original Mr. Men and Little Miss books created in the 1970s and 1980s by British author Roger Hargreaves and his son Adam Hargreaves. It was also created by Roger Hargreaves. The series was a co-production of Marina Productions and France 3 and aired on CITV in the United Kingdom (later reairing on Nickelodeon, Nick Jr. and Channel 5) and France 3 in France.

Episode list

Christmas special
 Christmas Rescue (a.k.a. "Mr. Men, Little Misses") (December 1991)

Educational special
 The Great Alphabet Hunt (1992)

Pilot
 Little Miss Splendid's Gift (21 August 1994)

Season 1 (1995)
 The Joke is on Little Miss Naughty (5 September 1995)
 Hurry Mr. Rush...autumn is coming! (8 September 1995)
 One day in the life of Mr. Perfect (16 October 1995)
 Mr. Uppity's big house (27 October 1995)
 Little Miss Busy takes a break (30 October 1995)
 Mr. Mischief is caught at his own game (17 November 1995)
 Little Miss Tidy loses a friend (20 November 1995)
 Mr. Funny puts on a show (15 December 1995)
 An unforgettable sunday for Miss Tiny (21 December 1995)
 Mr. Chatterbox loses his voice (25 December 1995)
 He...Hello Little Miss Shy (27 December 1995)
 An Invitation for Mr. Messy (31 December 1995)

Season 2 (1996)
 Mr. Bump goes on a trip (14 January 1996)
 Mr. Dizzy goes Doggy—sitting (23 January 1996)
 What a choice for little Miss Fickle! (30 January 1996)
 Happy Christmas Mr. Worry (10 February 1996)
 Mr. Nosey Solves a Mystery (12 February 1996)
 No food is no fun for Mr. Greedy (17 February 1996)
 A Special Friend for Little Miss Lucky (20 February 1996)
 Mr. Daydream Talks to the Stars (25 February 1996)
 That's Enough, Little Miss Bossy (29 February 1996)
 Mr. Forgetful...Hey waiter! (7 March 1996)
 Mr. Jelly's Show of Bravery (9 March 1996)
 Mr. Strong: King of the Circus (11 March 1996)
 Mr. Nonsense Rows To The Moon (14 March 1996)
 Little Miss Sunshine Brings a Smile (15 March 1996)
 Mr. Fussy Takes a Well—Earned Break (15 March 1996)
 Mr. Clumsy in the Brains and the Brawn (15 March 1996)
 Mr. Brave Goes Ghost Hunting (19 March 1996)
 Isn't Little Miss Trouble Kind... (19 March 1996)
 A Week—End with Little Miss Contrary (19 March 1996)
 Golly, Mr. Grumpy's Smiling (21 March 1996)
 Mr. Lazy Can't Sleep Anymore (21 March 1996)
 Mr. Small's Big Dream (21 March 1996)
 Mr. Bounce Finds Paradise (23 March 1996)
 What a Question, Little Miss Curious! (23 March 1996)
 Little Miss Stubborn Goes Right to the Bitter End (23 March 1996)
 Little Miss Greedy... Belle of the Ball (25 March 1996)
 Mr. Tickle Saves the Day (25 March 1996)
 Little Miss Wise's Crazy Day! (25 March 1996)
 A Rival for Little Miss Somersault (28 March 1996)
 Little Miss Star, the Leading Witness (28 March 1996)
 Little Miss Late Beats Them All! (28 March 1996)
 Mr. Skinny is Up the Spout (31 March 1996)
 That's Gratitude, Mr. Uppity! (31 March 1996)
 Little Miss Neat Sees Spots (31 March 1996)
 Mr. Grumble Boils Over (31 March 1996)

Season 3 (1997)
 Another Victory for Little Miss Splendid (2 January 1997)
 A Surprise for Mr. Tall (2 January 1997)
 Mr. Cheerful Doffs His Hat (2 January 1997)
 Little Miss Scatterbrain Puts Everything in Turmoil (14 January 1997)
 A Very Happy Day for Mr. Happy (14 January 1997)
 Mr. Clever's Daft Bet (14 January 1997)
 What a Mess, Little Miss Helpful! (17 January 1997)
 Little Miss Tidy and the Winning Ticket (January 17, 1997)
 Mr. Dizzy Promises the Moon (17 January 1997)
 Mr. Forgetful, the World's Best Actor! (20 January 1997)
 Hello, Pizza Express? (20 January 1997)
 Mr. Clumsy, Head Butler (20 January 1997)
 Mr. Impossible's Lesson (24 January 1997)
 Little Miss Star Goes to Jollywood (31 January 1997)
 Little Miss Chatterbox Finds her Calling (3 February 1997)
 Mr. Clever's Invention (3 February 1997)
 Mr. Skinny's Incredible Bet (3 February 1997)
 A Job for Little Miss Giggles (3 February 1997)
 Little Miss Busy, D.I.Y Teacher (3 February 1997)
 Little Miss Chatterbox Goes to Sea—Town (7 February 1997)
 Mr. Lazy Takes an Afternoon Nap (7 February 1997)
 Mr. Brave vs. Koko the Gorilla (7 February 1997)
 Little Miss Naughty Goes Skiing (8 February 1997)
 Little Miss Dotty Goes to Home Farm (16 February 1997)
 Mr. Nonsense's Strange Illness (4 March 1997)
 Mr. Mean Hasn't a Penny Left (15 March 1997)
 Little Miss Wise's Day Out at the Fun Fair (3 September 1997)
 Mr. Grumble's Holiday (3 September 1997)
 Little Miss Greedy's Strange Illness (3 September 1997)
 Mr. Slow Takes the Lead (3 September 1997)
 Mr. Strong Makes a Splash (3 September 1997)
 Mr. Perfect Goes West (3 September 1997)
 Little Miss Magic to the Rescue (3 September 1997)
 Mr. Silly's Silly Secret (3 September 1997)
 Mr. Chatterbox and the Parrot (3 September 1997)
 Little Miss Late Finally Catches Up (3 September 1997)
 Mr. Noisy, the music man (3 September 1997)
 Mr. Muddle Goes Skating (3 September 1997)
 Little Miss Helpful Goes to the Fair (4 September 1997)
 Mr. Worry and the Giant (4 September 1997)
 Mr. Greedy Goes to a Dinner Party (4 September 1997)
 Little Miss Bossy Has a Busy Day (4 September 1997)
 Mr. Bump Has an Accident (4 September 1997)
 Mr. Small Finds a Job (4 September 1997)
 Mr. Nosey Goes Fishing (4 September 1997)
 Little Miss Trouble and the Magic Paint (4 September 1997)
 It's Very Noisy for Mr. Quiet (5 September 1997)
 Mr. Mischief Becomes an Artist (5 September 1997)
 Lunch with Little Miss Tiny (5 September 1997)
 Mr. Clever Flies His Kite (5 September 1997)
 Thank Goodness for Mr. Slow (5 September 1997)
 Little Miss Shy Goes to the Fair (5 September 1997)
 A New House for Mr. Wrong (5 September 1997)
 Happy Birthday Little Miss Scatterbrain (6 September 1997)
 Mr. Jelly Goes Time—Travelling (7 September 1997)
 A Big Surprise for Mr. Mean (8 September 1997)

Christmas special
 The Christmas Letter (1998)

Voices

British voices

American voices

Greek voices

French voices

Trivia
Since the series was produced in France, it included some characters especially made for the country, such as Little Miss Prim in "Mr. Cheerful Doffs His Hat" and Little Miss Brilliant in "Little Miss Trouble and the Magic Paint". The French version also had lyrics to the theme tune, as well as a selection of episodes being novelised in France, which became a set of books by Adam Hargreaves, available in England in 2014.
The specials were not produced by Marina Productions; instead, the 1991 special was produced by Flicks Films Ltd. for TV-am and Mr. Films, while the educational special was produced by Abbey Home Entertainment and released on videocassette in 1992.
The episode "Hello, Pizza Express?" is Mr. Busy's own episode; his name is not mentioned on the title card.
Mr. Snow is the only character who doesn't appear in the series, but he appeared in its special, "The Christmas Letter". 
Mr. Clever is the only character who has three starring episodes of his own.
In the American dub, there are a couple instances where characters are voiced by different actors than who normally voice them. The most notable is in "Mr. Fussy Takes a Well Earned Break", where Mr. Messy is voiced by Neil Crone rather than Len Carlson.

References

External links 
Homepage
web.archive.org

1990s British animated television series
1995 British television series debuts
1997 British television series endings
1990s French animated television series
1995 French television series debuts
1997 French television series endings
British children's animated comedy television series
British television shows based on children's books
Channel 5 (British TV channel) original programming
English-language television shows
Fictional humanoids
French children's animated comedy television series
French television shows based on children's books
ITV children's television shows

Nick Jr. original programming
Nickelodeon original programming